Conor Fitzgerald may refer to:
 Conor Fitzgerald (hurler)
 Conor Fitzgerald (rugby union)